Galičnik is a mountain village in North Macedonia and along with Lazaropole is one of the two biggest and oldest Mijak villages in the region. Galičnik has well-preserved traditional architecture, including an amphitheater in the village square, and is famous for its surrounding countryside and nature reserve. People from Galičnik and northwestern North Macedonia appreciate the local yellow cheese kaškaval (Kashkaval) that is produced in the region as well as the local salt brine white cheese "belo sirenje" which is a homemade speciality for this region.

Location
It is located on the slopes of the Bistra Mountain, some 10 km from the artificial Mavrovo Lake and the Zare Lazarevski winter resort.

History

The village is located in the ethnographic region of "Mijačija", named after the Mijaks (Мијаци/Mijaci), the tribe historically inhabiting this mountainous region. This region has plentiful rich pastures for livestock grazing and this feature attracted Vlachs, shepherds, who established settlements based on cattle-breeding and shepherding. In the past, the economy of Galičnik relied on livestock, especially sheep trade; producing cheese, meat and wool products. Many families with huge flocks made fortunes and became very rich; these people are known locally as "chobans" a term for shepherds.

There was a strong tradition of pečalba, seasonal work, where many of the men would leave the village to work in larger towns and cities as skilled labourers such as masons, carpenters and painters. They would be absent from Galičnik for months or even years at a time. By seasonal work, they earned enough to support their families and sometimes made a fortune.

Events

The most important event in the village is the Galička Svadba, a traditional wedding custom held annually in summer (in July), on the day of the village feast of the Patron Saint – Petrovden (St. Peter's day). During the wedding, local men will dance the "Teškoto" (the "hard" or "heavy") - a dance that is meant to symbolize the overcoming of difficulties in life.
Another manifestation that takes place in Galičnik each year is the Galičnik Art Colony.

Culture 
The regional art, dress and music are rich in detail and original in character. While sharing characteristics of regional culture dating back centuries.

Traditional Costume 
The traditional dress and costume adorned during ceremonial events is highly detailed and unique. Examples can be seen at museums.

Architecture 

The village is built based on traditional housing standards used for centuries in the region. Stone wall construction, supported by wooden beams, compact earth insulation and using stone slate roofing.

Notable people from Galičnik
 Jakov Frchkovski
 Makarij Frckovski 
 Kuzman Frchkovski 
 Aleksandar Sarievski (1922–2002) 
 Georgi Pulevski (1817–1895) 
 Partenij Zografski (1818–1876)
 Dimitrije Bužarovski (b. 1952)
 Doksim Mihailović (1883–1912)
 Slavko Brezoski (1921-2017)
 Lazar Ličenoski

See also
Lazaropole

References

External links
Official web site of Galichnik
Penultimate Phase of Procedure for Entrance of Galicnik Wedding in UNESCO List - Custom with More than 30 Rites
Galicnik Macedonia, Kinoteka na Makedonija 1939-40 from filmarchivesonline
Images from Galičnik
Photos from Galichnik Wedding
 "Narodne pesme bugarske (iz Galečnika)", folk songs from Galichnik, published in the Croatian magazine "Kolo; Članci za Literaturu, Umetnost; Narodni Život", knjiga IV/V, Zagreb, in 1847.

Villages in Mavrovo and Rostuša Municipality